Yaquelín Plutín Tizón (born July 9, 1979 in Majagua, Ciego de Ávila) is a women's basketball player from Cuba. Playing as a center she won the gold medal with the Cuba women's national basketball team at the 2003 Pan American Games in Santo Domingo, Dominican Republic. 

Plutin also competed for her native country at the 2000 Summer Olympics in Sydney, Australia, finishing in ninth place in the final rankings. Her first is also spelled as Yakelyn.

References
FIBA Profile
 sports-reference

1979 births
Living people
Cuban women's basketball players
Basketball players at the 2000 Summer Olympics
Olympic basketball players of Cuba
Basketball players at the 2003 Pan American Games
Basketball players at the 2007 Pan American Games

Pan American Games gold medalists for Cuba
Pan American Games bronze medalists for Cuba
Pan American Games medalists in basketball
Centers (basketball)
Medalists at the 2003 Pan American Games
Medalists at the 2007 Pan American Games
People from Ciego de Ávila Province